Wang Congming (born 16 February 1999) is a Chinese footballer currently playing as a right-back for Chinese club a Dalian LFTZ Huayi.

Career statistics

Club
.

References

1999 births
Living people
Footballers from Anhui
Chinese footballers
Association football defenders
China League One players
Villarreal CF players
Beijing Guoan F.C. players
Suzhou Dongwu F.C. players
Liaoning Shenyang Urban F.C. players
Chinese expatriate sportspeople in Spain
Expatriate footballers in Spain